Tunnel Vision is a 1995 Australian mystery thriller film directed by Clive Fleury and starring Patsy Kensit, Robert Reynolds, Rebecca Rigg, and Shane Briant.

Cast
Patsy Kensit as Kelly Wheatstone
Robert Reynolds as Frank Yanovitch
Rebecca Rigg as Helena Martinelli
Shane Briant as Inspector Bosey
Gary Day as Steve Docherty
Justin Monjo as Craig Breslin
David E. Woodley as David De Salvo
Liz Burch as Mrs. Leyton
Jonathan Hardy as Henry Adams
Paul Denny as Driver
Puven Pather as Youth
Gennie Nevinson as Club Owner

Production
The film was shot in Queensland from 14 February to 20 March 1994 but was not released theatrically and was not released on video until 1996.

References

External links
 

1990s English-language films
1995 films
1990s thriller films
Australian thriller films
1990s Australian films